The Walker Art Gallery is an art gallery in Liverpool, which houses one of the largest art collections in England outside London. It is part of the National Museums Liverpool group.

History of the Gallery
The Walker Art Gallery's collection dates from 1819 when the Liverpool Royal Institution acquired 37 paintings from the collection of William Roscoe, who had to sell his collection following the failure of his banking business, though it was saved from being broken up by his friends and associates.

In 1843, the Royal Institution's collection was displayed in a purpose-built gallery next to the Institution's main premises. In 1850 negotiations by an association of citizens to take over the Institution's collection, for display in a proposed art gallery, library and museum, came to nothing.

The collection grew over the following decades: in 1851 Liverpool Town Council bought Liverpool Academy's diploma collection and further works were acquired from the Liverpool Society for the Fine Arts, founded in 1858. The competition between the academy and society eventually led to both collapsing.

William Brown Library and Museum opened in 1860, named after a Liverpool merchant whose generosity enabled the Town Council to act upon an 1852 Act of Parliament which allowed the establishment of a public library, museum and art gallery, and in 1871 the council organised the first Liverpool Autumn Exhibition, held at the new library and museum.

The success of the exhibition enabled the Library, Museum and Arts Committee to purchase works for the council's permanent collection, buying around 150 works between 1871 and 1910. Works acquired included WF Yeames' And when did you last see your father? and Dante Gabriel Rossetti's Dante's Dream.

Designed by local architects Cornelius Sherlock and H. H. Vale, the Walker Art Gallery was opened on 6 September 1877 by Edward Henry Stanley, 15th Earl of Derby. It is named after its founding benefactor, Sir Andrew Barclay Walker (1824–1893), a former mayor of Liverpool and wealthy brewer born in Ayrshire who expanded the family business to England and moved to live in Gateacre.

In 1893, the Liverpool Royal Institution placed its collection on long-term loan to the gallery and in 1948 presented William Roscoe's collection and other works. This occurred during post-war reconstruction when the gallery was closed, re-opening in 1951. During the Second World War the gallery was taken over by the Ministry of Food and the collection was dispersed for safety.

Extensions to the gallery were opened in 1884 and 1933 (following a two-year closure) when the gallery re-opened with an exhibition including Picasso and Gauguin. In 2002 the gallery re-opened following a major refurbishment.

In 1986, the gallery achieved national status, as part of the National Museums and Galleries on Merseyside.

The gallery is housed in a neo-Classical building located on William Brown Street (the only street in the United Kingdom to consist of nothing other than museums, galleries and libraries). The neighbouring area includes the William Brown Library, World Museum Liverpool, St. George's Hall, Wellington's Column, Lime Street Station and the entrance to the Queensway Tunnel. The other major art gallery in Liverpool is Tate Liverpool, at the Albert Dock, which houses modern art.

Permanent Collection

The Walker's collection includes Italian and Netherlandish paintings from 1300 to 1550, European art from 1550 to 1900, including works by Giambattista Pittoni, Rembrandt, Poussin and Degas, 18th and 19th-century British art, including a major collection of Victorian painting and many Pre-Raphaelite works, a wide collection of prints, drawings and watercolours, 20th-century works by artists such as Lucian Freud, David Hockney and Gilbert and George and a major sculpture collection.  The select collection of minor or decorative arts covers a wide range, from Gothic ivories to British ceramics up to the present day. The Gallery also houses the only original Stuart Sutcliffe painting on permanent display in Liverpool. 

On 17 December 2011, the Walker Art Gallery got a new addition to its collection – a statue of a priest vandalised by Banksy. The renowned graffiti artist has sawn off the face of an 18th-century replica stone bust and glued on a selection of bathroom tiles. The resulting 'pixellated' portrait is entitled Cardinal Sin and is believed to be a comment on the abuse scandal in the Church and its subsequent cover-up. This piece of art is displayed in Room three, which is one of the 17th-century Old Master galleries.

As of 2 July 2013, the La Masseuse sculpture by Edgar Degas, previously owned by Lucian Freud, found a permanent home at the Walker Art Gallery, thanks to the donation-in-payment system put in place by the Arts Council England.

Gallery

Exhibitions

The first John Moores Contemporary Painting Prize exhibition was held in 1957. Sponsored by Sir John Moores, founder of Littlewoods, the competition has been held every two years ever since and is the biggest painting prize in the UK.

There is a regular programme of temporary exhibitions which in 2009-10 has included Aubrey Williams, Bridget Riley, Sickert and Freud.

In 2004, the gallery staged The Stuckists Punk Victorian, the first national museum exhibition of the Stuckist art movement. The Gallery also takes part in the Liverpool Biennial.

See also
 Architecture of Liverpool
 Liverpool Biennial
 The Stuckists Punk Victorian

References

External links
 Website for The Walker Art Gallery, Liverpool
Walker Art Gallery within Google Arts & Culture

National Museums Liverpool
Art museums established in 1877
Art museums and galleries in Merseyside
Grade II* listed buildings in Liverpool
Grade II* listed museum buildings
Museums in Liverpool
1877 establishments in England
Neoclassical architecture in Liverpool